Christine Marie Janis is a British palaeontologist who specialises in mammals. She is currently based at the University of Bristol.

Background
Janis earned a bachelor's degree in Natural Sciences and Zoology from the University of Cambridge, and a PhD in Vertebrate Paleontology from Harvard University. She has held positions as a researcher and lecturer at Oregon State University, Cambridge, the Field Museum of Natural History in the University of Chicago, the University of Bristol, and Brown University.

In 1985 Janis was awarded the George Gaylord Simpson Prize for Paleontology (Yale University, USA) and was elected Fellow of the Paleontological Society in 2007.

Janis attributes her interest in palaeontology to seeing Fantasia as a child. She was married to fellow palaeontologist Jack Sepkoski (1948-1999).

Scientific contributions
Janis is best known for her contributions to the study of ungulates (hoofed mammals). As well as a large scientific publication list, Janis has contributed widely to textbooks and popular articles.

Her earlier publications examine mammal teeth. For example, ungulate teeth changed from low crowned teeth to high crowned hypsodont teeth, as they evolved to adapt to a grassland diet, and this is correlated with changes in their digestion and can be used in their taxonomy. She created the Hipsodonty Index, broadly used in mammal paleontology. Her work on the evolution of horns in ungulates won her the Simpson Prize in 1985.

In the 1990s, Janis switched focus from teeth to the biomechanics of locomotion. She has produced seminal works on the relationships between the lengths of limb bones in running mammals and their locomotion. Latterly Janis has worked closely with her students and close colleagues to explore locomotion in various mammal groups, including camels,  various carnivores, and marsupials.

Among Janis's publications are the co-authored textbooks Evolution of Tertiary Mammals of North America. Vol. 2: Small Mammals, Edentates, and Marine Mammals and Vertebrate Life.

Affiliations

Society of Vertebrate Paleontology (USA)
The Paleontological Society (USA)
The Palaeontological Association (UK)
GRIPS (Greater Rhode Island Paleontological Society) charter member.
Society for the Study of Mammalian Evolution (president)
Society for Integrative and Comparative Biology
National Center for Science Education

References

Living people
British palaeontologists
Alumni of the University of Cambridge
Harvard University alumni
Academics of the University of Bristol
Women paleontologists
Year of birth missing (living people)
Oregon State University faculty
University of Chicago faculty
Brown University faculty